Arab Laleh Gun (also Romanized as ‘Arab Lāleh Gūn) is a village in Golidagh Rural District, Golidagh District, Maraveh Tappeh County, Golestan Province, Iran. At the 2006 census, its population was 618, in 126 families.

References 

Populated places in Maraveh Tappeh County